Chlorochlamys phyllinaria, the thin-lined chlorochlamys moth, is a moth of the  family Geometridae. It is found in North America, where it has been recorded from Georgia to California, northward in the central states to Nebraska.

The length of the forewings is 6–9 mm for males and 7–10.5 mm for females. The forewings are usually olive green, but sometimes tan or reddish brown. There are thin whitish or yellowish lines. The hindwings are similar, but always without an antemedial line. Adults are usually on wing from June to September, but from March to November in the south-west.

References

Moths described in 1872
Hemitheini